Daviesia brevifolia, commonly known as leafless bitter-pea, is a species of flowering plant in the family Fabaceae and is endemic to the southern continental Australia. It is a broom-like shrub with short, cylindrical phyllodes and apricot to reddish-brown flowers.

Description

Taxonomy
Daviesia brevifolia was first formally in 1838 described by John Lindley in Thomas Mitchell's journal, Three Expeditions into the interior of Eastern Australia. The specific epithet (brevifolia) means "short-leaved".

Distribution and habitat
Leafless bitter-pea grows in forest and woodland and heath in western Victoria and the south-east of South Australia.

References

brevifolia
Flora of South Australia
Flora of Victoria (Australia)
Plants described in 1838
Taxa named by John Lindley